Dominic D. P. Johnson is an Alistair Buchan Professor of International Relations at St Antony's College, Oxford.

Education 
He received a D. Phil. in biology from the University of Oxford in 2001 and a PhD in political science from the University of Geneva in 2004. Drawing on both disciplines, he researches and writes on the role of human biology and evolution in understanding the behaviour of individuals, groups, organizations, and states.

Career 
Johnson held several post-doctoral fellowships in the United States prior to being hired at Edinburgh. He was a National Security Fellow at the Olin Institute for Strategic Studies at Harvard University 2002–2003, a Science Fellow at the Center for International Security and Cooperation at Stanford University 2003–2004, a visiting Fellow in the Global Fellows Program of the International Institute at the University of California, Los Angeles 2004–2006, and a Fellow in the Society of Fellows at Princeton University, 2004–2007, where he was also a lecturer at Princeton's Woodrow Wilson School of Public and International Affairs. He was also a Society in Science Branco Weiss Fellow from 2004–2009.

Work 
In addition to over forty articles published in academic journals and edited books, he is the author of three books. "Overconfidence and War: The Havoc and Glory of Positive Illusions" (Harvard University Press, 2004), argues that the widespread human tendency to maintain overly positive images of ourselves, of our control over events, and of the future (positive illusions), play a key role in the causes of war. "Failing to Win: Perceptions of Victory and Defeat in International Politics" (Harvard University Press, 2006), with Dominic Tierney, explores how common psychological biases generate powerful misconceptions about the success and failure of political events, altering the lessons that people learn from history. "Failing to Win" won the 2006 Best Book Award from the International Studies Association.

Awards and recognition 
 2001: 2nd prize in business plan competition, National Environment Research Council
 2004: Best PhD from Geneva University during 2002–04, Swiss Political Science Association
 2005: Overconfidence and War named an Honor Book, New Jersey Council for the Humanities
 2008: Failing to Win named Best Book in International Studies, International Studies Association
 2011: Chancellor's "Rising Star" Award, University of Edinburgh

Bibliography

Books 
 
  With Dominic Tierney.

Selected articles 
 Johnson, Dominic DP, and James H. Fowler. "The evolution of overconfidence." Nature 477.7364 (2011): 317–320.
 King, AJ, Johnson, DDP & Van Vugt, M (2009) The origins and evolution of leadership. Current Biology 19 (19): 1591–1682.
 Johnson, DDP, & Levin, SA (2009) The tragedy of cognition: psychological biases and environmental inaction. Current Science 97 (11): 1593–1603.
 McDermott, R, Tingley, D, Cowden, J, Frazzetto, G. & Johnson, DDP (2009) Monoamine oxidase A gene (MAOA) predicts behavioral aggression following provocation. Proceedings of the National Academy of Sciences .
 Johnson, DDP, McDermott, R, Barrett, ES, Cowden, J, Wrangham, R, McIntyre, MH & Rosen, SP (2006) Overconfidence in wargames: experimental evidence on expectations, aggression, gender and testosterone. Proceedings of the Royal Society (B) 273 (1600): 2513–2520.
 Johnson, DDP & Bering, JM (2006) Hand of God, mind of man: punishment and cognition in the evolution of cooperation. Evolutionary Psychology 4: 219–233.
 Johnson, DDP (2005) God's punishment and public goods: A test of the supernatural punishment hypothesis in 186 world cultures. Human Nature 16 (4): 410–446.

References

External links 
 
 Project on the Evolution of Religions

Academics of the University of Edinburgh
Living people
Scottish scholars and academics
Alumni of the University of Oxford
Fellows of St Antony's College, Oxford
Harvard Fellows
Stanford University fellows
Columbia University fellows
Princeton University fellows
University of California, Los Angeles fellows
Year of birth missing (living people)